Church of the Redeemer may refer to:

Germany 
Church of the Redeemer, Bad Homburg, Hesse
Erlöserkirche (Dresden)
Church of the Redeemer, Sacrow, Brandenburg

United States 
 Old Holy Redeemer Catholic Church, Kissimmee, Florida
 Holy Redeemer Church (Eagle Harbor, Michigan)
 Church of the Redeemer (Cannon Falls, Minnesota)
 Church of the Redeemer (Longport, New Jersey)
 Church of the Redeemer (Addison, New York)
 Church of the Redeemer (Asheville, North Carolina)
 Church of the Redeemer (Orangeburg, South Carolina)
 Church of the Redeemer (Houston, Texas)
 Greater Union Baptist Church, originally built as Church of the Redeemer, Chicago, Illinois

Elsewhere
Cathedral Church of the Redeemer, Calgary, Alberta, Canada
Church of the Redeemer (Toronto), Ontario, Canada
Church of the Redeemer, Jerusalem, Israel (Lutheran)
Il Redentore, Church of the Most Holy Redeemer, Venice, Italy
Church of the Redeemer, Jamaica, Kingston, Jamaica
Church of the Redeemer, Amman, Jordan

See also
 Episcopal Church of the Redeemer (disambiguation)